Sebuah Nama, Sebuah Cerita (One Name, One Story) is the only compilation album and final album released from Peterpan. The album was released in 2008. First single from this album is "Walau Habis Terang" (English translation: "Though Light's Gone Out"). The album released in two version, cassette version and CD version. CD version contains 30 songs (3 new songs, a new-arrangement Chrisye's song and 26 hits songs from previous album). Meanwhile, cassette version just contains 21 songs (3 new songs, a new-arrangement Crisye's song and 17 hits songs from previous album). This album has sold over 550.000 copies in indonesia.

Background
After Andika and Indra split from Peterpan, they asked the remaining band members to change their band name. Since according to their agreement Andika and Indra have right to the name, the others agree to change the Peterpan name. For their last album with Peterpan name, they decided to make a "best of the best" album, so Peterpan's last album will be composed of their best songs. Peterpan also recorded new songs for this album as, according to their vocalist Ariel, they wanted to make the album as special as possible.

Songs
Sebuah Nama, Sebuah Cerita is a double album consisting of 30 songs in the CD version and 21 songs in the cassette version. Among those songs are four new recordings: "Walau Habis Terang", "Kisah Cintaku", "Dilema Besar", and "Tak Ada yang Abadi". "Kisah Cintaku" is a song by Indonesian singer Chrisye from his 1988 album Jumpa Pertama. Peterpan's guitarist Uki said that Peterpan covered the song as a tribute to Chrisye for his influence on Peterpan's development. "Tak Ada yang Abadi" according to Ariel is a song that fits Peterpan's feelings as they are changing their name.

Release 
Peterpan released Sebuah Nama, Sebuah Cerita in XXI Lounge Jakarta Theater, Central Jakarta on 8 August 2008. The album sold over 580 thousand copies.

Track listings (CD version)
CD 1

CD 2

References 

Noah (band) albums
2008 compilation albums